The Mark of the Day (French: Le Point du jour, usually translated as 'Daybreak') is a 1949 French film directed by Louis Daquin. It stars Yvette Etiévant and is set in a coal-mining community in the north of France.

External links

1949 films
1940s French-language films
Films directed by Louis Daquin
French black-and-white films
French drama films
1949 drama films
Films set in mining communities
1940s French films